Hyphessobrycon copelandi is a species of South American tetra, belonging to the family Characidae. They are gray in coloration with a faint black humeral spot. Their dorsal, pectoral, and anal fins are white fronted. It is known to reach a length of 3.5 centimeters (1.4 inches). Hyphessobrycon copelandi is known to live in the Solimões, Mana, and Approuague River Basins. It is most often found in slow moving waters or areas in creeks with a counter current. It inhabits the upstream part of the river before waterfalls. They have seen limited use in the fish trade, even having a common name in German, federsalmler, which translates to "feather tetra". As a benthopelagic fish, they reside away from the surface of the water.

References 

Characidae